Yves Boyer (born 19 June 1965) is a French luger. He competed in the men's singles and doubles events at the 1992 Winter Olympics.

References

External links
 

1965 births
Living people
French male lugers
Olympic lugers of France
Lugers at the 1992 Winter Olympics
Sportspeople from Albertville